Katherine Patricia Irene Adams, Baroness Adams of Craigielea (born 27 December 1947) is a Scottish Labour peer who served as the Member of Parliament for Paisley North from 1990 to 2005.

Early life
Adams was educated at Stanley Green High School in Paisley, marrying Allen Adams in February 1968 with whom she had three children. In 1970 she was on Paisley Town Council and by 1972 was appointed Justice of the Peace. In 1974, as Katherine Adams, she became a councillor for Stanley Ward of Renfrew District Council, but failed to be reelected in 1977 following a general collapse in the Labour vote. In 1979, she stood for and won the Paisley Craigielea seat on Strathclyde Regional Council succeeding her husband, Allen Adams, who had stepped down from the council following his election as MP. She successfully stood for reelection in 1982, retiring in 1986.

Parliamentary career
Her husband, Allen Adams, had been MP for Paisley North until his death on 5 September 1990 at the age of 44 from a brain haemorrhage. Irene, who had served as his secretary during his time as MP, stood in the subsequent by-election and despite a swing to the SNP, went on to win with 44% of the vote. She successfully defended the seat in the next three General Elections.

As an MP, she had been outspoken on the issue of drug abuse and gang violence and received death threats. Media sources speculated that the 1999 torching of her car was as a result of this work. Despite being loyal to the Labour government of the day, Adams was seen as clearly on its left wing including being against the Iraq war, a Eurosceptic and one of the more pro-devolution Scottish Labour members. Within the Labour party, it was alleged that she had been the target of "bad mouthing" by fellow Labour MP Tommy Graham, which lead to Graham's expulsion from the party in 1999.

Adams was persuaded to stand down with the promise of a peerage, in order to allow sitting West Renfrewshire MP Jim Sheridan to be selected to fight in the May 2005 election for the newly merged seat of Paisley and Renfrewshire North. Following the General Election, on 13 May 2005 it was announced that she would be created a life peer as Baroness Adams of Craigielea, of Craigielea in the County of Renfrewshire, on 28 June.

Peerage and expenses
Despite no longer being a member of the House of Commons, Adams along with 13 other MPs was the subject of a court case over the release of information into parliamentary expenses. As a result of the widespread expenses scandal within parliament, she was ultimately asked pay over £50,000 which she initially refused to do.

Adams is not noted for being an active member of the House of Lords, and attracted criticism for claiming expenses despite having only made a single contribution, her maiden speech, between May 2005 and October 2010. She currently lives in a converted mill in Paisley.

References

External links

1947 births
Living people
Scottish Labour MPs
Adams of Craigielea
Female members of the Parliament of the United Kingdom for Scottish constituencies
Members of the Parliament of the United Kingdom for Paisley constituencies
Scottish Labour councillors
Life peeresses created by Elizabeth II
UK MPs 1987–1992
UK MPs 1992–1997
UK MPs 1997–2001
UK MPs 2001–2005
Politicians from Paisley, Renfrewshire
20th-century Scottish women politicians
20th-century Scottish politicians
21st-century Scottish women politicians
21st-century Scottish politicians
Women councillors in Scotland